Jennifer Brady defeated Jil Teichmann in the final, 6–3, 6–4 to win the singles tennis title at the 2020 Top Seed Open. Brady did not drop a set, or face a tiebreak in any set, en route to her maiden WTA Tour singles title.

Kim Da-bin was the defending champion from 2019, when it was an $60k event. However, she was unable to participate due to insufficient ranking and travel restrictions resulting from the COVID-19 pandemic.

The second-round match between Serena and Venus Williams marked the first time that two players faced each other in four different decades. It also marked the longest gap between the first meeting and the last meeting between two players (22 years and 7 months). With Serena’s retirement in September 2022, this marked the final encounter in the Williams sisters rivalry.

With her quarterfinal win, Shelby Rogers became only the fourth player ranked outside the top 100 and the first since Virginie Razzano at the 2012 French Open to defeat Serena Williams in a main-draw match.

Seeds

Draw

Finals

Top half

Bottom half

Qualifying

Seeds

Qualifiers

Lucky loser

Qualifying draw

First qualifier

Second qualifier

Third qualifier

Fourth qualifier

Fifth qualifier

Sixth qualifier

References

External links
 Qualifying draw
 Main draw

2020 Singles
Top Seed Open – Singles